Namalata is a village and island in Fiji. It is located in the southern portion of the Vanua Balavu island group, part of Fiji's Lau Islands. The village is a constituent of the larger Lomaloma village.

The people of Namalata descend from the original inhabitants of Mago Island, who were displaced in the nineteenth century.

Chiefly titles
The Chief of Namalata Village is the Tui Mago.

From Mago to Namalata
In the mid-19th century, Fiji's two dominant chiefs at the time, the Vunivalu of Bau (Seru Epenisa Cakobau) and the Tui Cakau were threatened by the Tongan warlord, Enele Ma'afu.  They sought the help of the Namalata people while Ma'afu was in Lomaloma, on Vanua Balavu, as they could provide information on his movements. 

The island of Mago was then given to Europeans in order to slow Ma'afu's advancement into Fiji, as the threat of retaliation from their respective homelands deterred him from attacking Europeans.  When Fiji was ceded to the United Kingdom in 1874, those occupying the island were registered as the rightful owners, thus dispossessing the Namalata people. Mago Island is now owned by actor and film director Mel Gibson.

References 
 Derrick, Ronald Albert; The Fiji Islands, a Geographical Handbook, published 1957 Govt. Press, Original from the University of Michigan, Digitized July 1, 2006. Contains basic details on Namalata.

External links 
 Mel Gibson's purchase of Mago
  Research Paper on Vanuabalavu has map and reference re Namalata
article on Fijivillage.com regarding the story of the Namalata people from Mago

Namalata
Populated places in Fiji
Human migrations